The New York Jazz Quartet in Chicago is an album by pianist Roland Hanna and the New York Jazz Quartet which was recorded in 1981 and released on the Bee Hive label.

Reception

The AllMusic review by Scott Yanow stated, "The New York Jazz Quartet gave pianist Roland Hanna, Frank Wess (doubling on tenor and flute), bassist George Mraz and drummer Ben Riley an opportunity to collaborate and, although the group did not develop any innovations, it did record several excellent albums. This Bee Hive album is one of their more extroverted affairs".

Track listing

Personnel
Roland Hanna – piano
Frank Wess – tenor saxophone, flute
George Mraz – bass
Ben Riley – drums

References

Roland Hanna albums
New York Jazz Quartet albums
1982 albums
Bee Hive Records albums